The Iran national handball team is the national handball team of Iran and is controlled by the IR Iran Handball Federation.

Tournament records

World Championship

Asian Championship

Asian Games

Other tournaments

Islamic Solidarity Games

West Asian Games

Team

Current squad
Squad for the 2023 World Men's Handball Championship.

Head coach: Veselin Vujović

Former coaches
  Yury Klimov
  Yuri Kidyaev (2009–2010)
  Borut Maček (2010)
  Ivica Rimanić (2011–2012)
  Rafael Guijosa (2012–2014)
  Borut Maček (2014–2015)
  Irfan Smajlagić (2015–2016)
  Mohsen Taheri (2016)
  Alireza Habibi (2017)
  Borut Maček (2017)
  Zoran Kastratović (2018)
  Alireza Habibi (2019–2020)
  Manuel Montoya (2021–2022)
  Veselin Vujović (2022–)

Past squads
 2006 Asian Games –  Bronze medal
Farid Alimoradi, Alireza Rabie Dolatabadi, Mostafa Sadati, Iman Ehsannejad, Hossein Shahabi, Ali Akbar Khoshnevis, Masoud Zohrabi, Peyman Sadeghi, Hojjat Rahshenas, Saeid Pourghasemi, Mohammad Reza Jafarnia, Hani Zamani, Mohammad Reza Rajabi, Allahkaram Esteki and Rasoul Dehghani. Head Coach: Yury Klimov

Notable players
Iman Jamali (later Hungary)

References

External links

IHF profile

Handball in Iran
Men's national handball teams
Handball